Nils Johansson may refer to:

 Nils Johansson (cyclist) (1920–1999), Swedish cyclist
 Nils Johansson (footballer), Swedish footballer
 Nils Johansson (ice hockey, born 1904) (1904–1936), Swedish ice hockey player
 Nils Johansson (ice hockey, born 1938), Swedish ice hockey player
 Nils Johansson (politician) (1864–1941), Swedish politician
 Nils-Eric Johansson (born 1980), Swedish football player